Mohamud Hassan Suleiman is a Somali politician. On 4 November 2012, he was appointed the Minister of Finance and Planning of Somalia by Prime Minister Abdi Farah Shirdon. On 17 January 2014, Suleiman was succeeded as Minister of Finance by Hussein Abdi Halane and as Minister of Planning by Said Abdullahi Mohamed.

References

Living people
Year of birth missing (living people)
Ethnic Somali people
Finance ministers of Somalia